The BBC African Sports Personality of the Year (previously known as the BBC African Sports Star of the Year and the BBC African Footballer of the Year) was an annual award given to the best African sports personality of the year as voted by the BBC radio listeners. Voting is done via SMS and online.

History
Initially a sports award, the inaugural winner was Ghana's Abedi Pele in 1992. The only non-footballers to win the award was track and field athlete Frankie Fredericks in 1993, and long-distance track and road running athlete Haile Gebrselassie from Ethiopia, in 1998. The Zambia national football team were posthumous winners of the award in 1994, following the plane crash in the Atlantic Ocean a year previous. The award became centred around football from 2001 onwards, Cameroon's Patrick M'Boma was the last person to win it as a sports award.

Nigeria's Nwankwo Kanu and Jay-Jay Okocha, as well as the Ivory Coast's Yaya Touré and Egypt's Mohamed Salah are the only players to win the award more than once, with two wins.

In 2019, the award was changed back to its initial concept and renamed as the BBC African Sports Personality of the Year to reflect the balance between gender, disability and variety of sports on offer. However there were no awards in 2019 and in 2020 due to the COVID-19 pandemic. In 2022, after it was returned back to the sports award, Christine Mboma became the first person to win the award for 2021 season.

Winners

Wins by country

Wins by club

See also

African Footballer of the Year

References

External links

Confederation of African Football trophies and awards
BBC Radio
BBC World Service
African
African football trophies and awards
Africa BBC